1931 in philosophy

Events

Publications 
 Kurt Gödel, On Formally Undecidable Propositions of Principia Mathematica and Related Systems (1931)

Births 
 April 16 - Leo Bersani (died 2022)
 May 19 - Alfred Schmidt (died 2012)
 June 3 - John Norman 
 August 4 - Paul Avrich (died 2006)
 August 8 - Roger Penrose 
 September 3 - Samir Amin (died 2018)
 September 29 - Sydney Shoemaker (died 2022)
 October 4 - Richard Rorty (died 2007)
 November 5 - Charles Taylor 
 December 11 - Ronald Dworkin (died 2013)
 December 28 - Guy Debord (died 1994)

Deaths 
 April 10 - Kahlil Gibran (born 1883)
 April 26 - George Herbert Mead (born 1863)

References 

Philosophy
20th-century philosophy
Philosophy by year